The Superior School in Superior in Mineral County, Montana was built in 1915–16.  It was listed on the National Register of Historic Places in 1997.  The listed  property included two contributing buildings.

It is a raised two-and-a-half-story brick building in a combination of vernacular  Colonial Revival styling.  It was built by local contractor Charles Augustine.

References

National Register of Historic Places in Mineral County, Montana
Colonial Revival architecture in Montana
School buildings completed in 1916
Schools in Mineral County, Montana
School buildings on the National Register of Historic Places in Montana
1916 establishments in Montana